Speak Now is the third studio album by American singer-songwriter Taylor Swift.

Speak Now may also refer to:

Music
"Speak Now" (song), a song by Taylor Swift
Speak Now World Tour, a tour by Taylor Swift
Speak Now World Tour – Live, a live album by Taylor Swift
"Speak Now", a song by Leslie Odom Jr. from One Night in Miami... (2020)
"Speak Now or Forever Hold Your Peace", song from Cheap Trick (1977 album)

Other uses
Speak Now, 1971 play by Olwen Wymark
Speak Now, 2003 novel by Kaylie Jones
"Speak Now", 2004 episode of The Dead Zone (TV series) with Ellie Harvie
Speak Now, 2013 film premiered at Austin Film Festival with Abby Miller